Corey Rozzoni, also known as Rizzo, is an American musician and songwriter. He currently plays guitar for Nashville, TN based, Lights of Marfa.

Biography 
Born in Kenosha, WI and raised in Rockton, IL, Rizzo knew very early on that he wanted to play guitar. His parents had taken him to see Kiss in concert in 1979 and instantly he wanted to be Ace Frehley. He began taking lessons at Paradise Guitars in Beloit, WI at age 9, beginning with more formal training and competing in the Illinois Music League competitions in the early 80's. He placed second both years he entered (he jokes that there were only 2 competitors). Once he found rock music, his life was changed and he immersed himself in the guitar heavy music of the 80's rock bands (Van Halen, AC/DC, Scorpions, Tesla, Ratt, Whitesnake, etc.)

Rizzo formed his first band, China White, with his elementary school classmates Chad Coonrod (drums) and John Pond (bass), along with a lead singer from a neighboring town, Jesse Foht. The band played their first club show before 3 of the 4 members could even drive.

He relocated to Dallas, TX in 1997 with LeSonic. The band split up soon after the move and Rizzo was left bandless. In 1999 he joined Clumsy (featuring Marc Solomon formerly of Perfect and the Clowns). He spent 2 years touring with the band before they decided to call it quits and pursue other projects.

Rizzo continued to write and demo songs with plans of relocating to Los Angeles, CA, but in June 2003 he received a call from his friend Casey Orr, who also happened to play bass for the Burden Brothers. He asked if Rizzo would be interested in auditioning for the open guitar player spot in the band. He accepted, auditioned and got the job. He was a member of the Burden Brothers from August 2003 to August 2007. While he was a member of the band they released two albums, Buried in Your Black Heart (2003) and Mercy (2006), on Kirtland Records as well as a live performance DVD entitled RYFOLAMF.

Rizzo officially left the band on May 29, 2007. His departure was not announced until August 6, 2007, one day after his last show on August 5, 2007 in Madison, WI.

In September 2008 Rizzo moved to Nashville, TN and from 2009 until 2013 was a member of the Nashville-based band, Adalene. The band released two EP's - 2010's "Night On Fire" and 2013's "Atlantic Heart" before disbanding.

Since late 2014 he has been working on his own band called Lights of Marfa. In late 2015 they released "The Light of Sound" EP. In February 2019 they began releasing a new single each month.

Equipment 
Guitars

Gibson
2007 Les Paul Custom - Silverburst
1994 Les Paul Custom - Wine Red
1992 Les Paul Custom - Alpine White
Godin
2017 Summit Classic HB - Black
2010 Icon Type 2 Convertible - Sunburst
2010 Icon Type 2 Convertible - Black
2010 Icon Type 2 Convertible - Burgundy
Seagull
2017 Maritime SWS Dreadnought
2004 Custom Double Cutaway w/ Floyd Rose tremolo and custom paint by Joe Martin of The Martin Brothers

Amplifiers
REVV Amplification
Generator 100P
Bogner Amplification
Ecstasy 101B
Mather Cab
2x12 - Ported

Effects
Line 6 Helix Rack
Ernie Ball VP Jr Volume Pedal
Jim Dunlop DVP3 Volume X
Sonic Research ST-300 Turbo Tuner Mini
Digitech Drop Pedal
BOSS NS-2 Noise Suppressor
Two Notes Captor, Reload, C.A.B. & C.A.B. M

Other
Strings & Picks
Jim Dunlop
Pickups
Seymour Duncan
Miscellaneous
Mogami cables
Monster cables
George L cables
Line 6 wireless
Temple Audio pedalboards
Graph Tech accessories
Mental Case road cases
Gator guitar cases

Awards 
Voted "Best Guitarist" by the readers of the Dallas Observer in 2005's Dallas Observer Music Awards.

Discography

Albums 
Burden Brothers
Buried in Your Black Heart (2003)
Mercy (2006)

Solly
You Know What You Should Do (2008) - Where Would You Be? (track 5)

EPs and singles 
Burden Brothers
Beautiful Night (2003)
"Shadow" (2004)
"Walk Away" / "Jailbreak" (2005)

Adalene
Night On Fire (2010)
Atlantic Heart (2013)

Lights of Marfa
The Light of Sound (2015)
Wonderful Christmastime (Paul McCartney cover) - Single (December 7, 2018)
Heaven Knows - Single (February 1, 2019)
Run To You (Bryan Adams cover) - Single (March 1, 2019)

DVDs 
Burden Brothers
RYFOLAMF (2005)

Compilations and Promos 
Burden Brothers
 Buried in Your Black Heart release party CD (Kirtland, 2003)
 99.5 KISS Rocks San Antonio (KISS-FM, 2004)
 Includes "Beautiful Night"
 Summer Lovin' Volume 4 (KDGE, 2004)
 Includes "Shadow (live)"
 Kirtland Records Compilation (2004)
 Includes "Beautiful Night" and the music video for "Shadow"

References

External links 

American rock guitarists
American male guitarists
Burden Brothers members
Living people
1973 births
People from Rockton, Illinois
21st-century American guitarists
21st-century American male musicians